Hajdučka Republika Mijata Tomića, is the private property of Mijat Tomić, spreading over seven hectares between the mountains of Vran and Čvrsnica, and a tourist destination as a self-proclaimed fictional micronation in Bosnia and Herzegovina, in the middle of the Blidinje Nature Park in the north-western parts of region of Herzegovina.

Overview
The republic was founded on the day of Diva Grabovčeva (29 June) in 2002, named after hajduk Mijat Tomić, who had its hiding place in the nearby caves.

The republic has a consul and portparolle. The formation of political parties is strictly forbidden, as well as any dealing with politics, since "it is not good for human beings".

Its state flag has a white background, in the upper left corner is the state coat of arms, which is a chessboard, and in the middle is the picture of Mijat Tomić marked in blue.

History
Problems began when Vinko Vukoja wanted to solve a problem in connection with the main power supply net. As this area was on unclaimed land – three municipalities (Posušje, Tomislavgrad and Jablanica, couldn't agree for years under whose responsibility the area fell, and whenever the motel owner asked any of the municipalities to solve its problem, they rejected him, saying it was not their problem, and referred him to one of other two municipalities. Finally, he solved that with his money.

In the alleged "no one's land", the Hajdučka Republika was proclaimed in 29 June 2002. On the day of the proclamation, SFOR was alarmed by some persons. As SFOR saw the true nature of this project, they left the very same day. The republic has no separatist or hegemonic ambitions.

Thanks to this fun protest project, its motel became one of the most popular places in western Herzegovina. Every year, there is a manifestation Triba slagat i ostat živ (To lie and stay alive). This project attracted the attention of Bosnian, Croat and Serb media, as well as some media outside the Balkans.

On 16 October 2009, President Vinko Vukoja died in a car accident. His daughter Marija inherited his position and the title "harambaša" (chieftain).

Currency

The kubura is the purported currency of Hajdučka Republika Mijata Tomića.

See also
 List of micronations

References

Sources

Mijata Tomica
States and territories established in 2002
2002 establishments in Bosnia and Herzegovina
Tourism in Bosnia and Herzegovina
Blidinje plateau